
Gmina Krajenka is an urban-rural gmina (administrative district) in Złotów County, Greater Poland Voivodeship, in west-central Poland.

Villages
Apart from the town of Krajenka, Gmina Krajenka contains the villages and settlements of Augustowo, Barankowo, Czajcze, Dolnik, Głubczyn, Krajenka-Wybudowanie, Leśnik, Łońsko, Maryniec, Paruszka, Podróżna, Pogórze, Rogownica, Skórka, Śmiardowo Krajeńskie, Tarnówczyn, Wąsoszki and Żeleźnica.

Neighbouring gminas
Gmina Krajenka is bordered by the town of Piła and by the gminas of Kaczory, Szydłowo, Tarnówka, Wysoka and Złotów.

References
Polish official population figures 2006

Krajenka
Złotów County